Paiyaa is a 2010 Indian Tamil-language action-adventure film written, produced and directed by N. Linguswamy. It stars Karthi and Tamannaah, with Sonia Deepti, Milind Soman and Jagan appearing in supporting roles. The film, produced by N. Subash Chandra Bose under the banner of Thirupathi Brothers and distributed by Dhayanidhi Alagiri's Cloud Nine Movies, features a film score and soundtrack composed by Yuvan Shankar Raja, cinematography by Madhi and editing by Anthony Gonsalves.

In the film, a young woman is driven from Bangalore to Mumbai by a jobless young man who must evade gangsters chasing after them, as well as confront his own violent past in the city. Following a lengthy pre-production phase, during which the film underwent major changes in its main cast and its technical crew, it began shooting in December 2008 at various locations throughout South India, most notably in Karnataka, Andhra Pradesh and Maharashtra.

Paiyaa was released on 2 April 2010 to positive reviews and was commercially successful. The Telugu dubbed version of the film titled Awara was released on 21 May 2010 in Andhra Pradesh and received positive response. The film was remade in Bengali in 2012 as Jaaneman, starring Soham Chakraborty and Koel Mallick, and in Kannada in 2014 as Ajith, with Chiranjeevi Sarja playing the male lead.

Plot
Shivamanikandan aka Shiva is a young, carefree, unemployed man staying in Bangalore. He has a loyal group of friends, including his best friend, Priya, with whom he shares his feelings. His friends are determined to get him a job. One day he sees a young, beautiful woman named Charulatha, who is also looking for a job. Shiva is immediately attracted to her. He subsequently spots Charulatha on various occasions and follows her, but loses sight of her each time. He even misses a job interview Priya has arranged for him.

Later, as Shivamanikandan waits at the railway station to pick up a friend and owner of the Mitsubishi Lancer Shivamanikandan and his friends use, he is confronted by a tense Charulatha, accompanied by her uncle. They assume that Shivamanikandan is a cab driver and ask him to take them to Chennai. An excited Shivamanikandan accepts the offer and takes them. While stopping to refuel the car, Charulatha suddenly requests Shivamanikandan to drive on, leaving her uncle behind; Shivamanikandan does as she wishes and takes off. She first asks Shivamanikandan to drop her at the airport, but she misses the flight and later, at railway station, she is unable to go by train. So, she asks Shivamanikandan if he will take her to Mumbai by car.

Shivamanikandan instantly agrees and drives her to Mumbai. Shivamanikandan tries to get into a conversation with Charulatha. She initially refuses to talk, but eventually gives in and tells him about her background. It comes to light that Charulatha's mother, who had always supported her daughter, died after a violent altercation with her father; since then, her father has tried to force Charulatha to marry an unknown man of his choice. Not willing to bow to her father's wishes, she had escaped from home, but was later found by her father's business partner, Jayaraman, her supposed uncle. He was about to take her to register the marriage arranged by her father when Charulatha tried to escape, leaving him behind at the filling station. Now she wants to head to Mumbai to stay at her grandmother's home.

However, Charulatha is being followed by a gang, led by a furious Telugu-speaking lady. Shivamanikandan manages to lose the pursuers and decides to change the route to avoid the gang, but encounters a second gang. He realises that this gang is not following Charulatha, but himself, as they are the henchmen of a Mumbai-based gangster Baali. He recalls an incident that happened some years ago in Mumbai, when he stayed there at his friend Poochi's house. He had beaten one of Baali's men, who had attacked him, and later Baali himself, not knowing about him and his reputation in the city, and returned to Bangalore. Both gangs are following the couple to achieve their own ends. After reaching Mumbai and experiencing a series of events, they end up at Poochi's house. Poochi finds out where the grandmother lives, and Shivamanikandan brings Charulatha there. Shivamanikandan , unable to bear the thought that the journey is complete, leaves silently only to find Charulatha on the road. After hesitating, she reveals that her relatives had spoken ill about her parents, which prompted her to leave, not wanting to push the matter further. While in a state of doubt, they are attacked by Baali's gang, who have teamed up with Jayaraman.

Shivamanikandan saves Charulatha from the clutches of the goons by single-handedly overpowering them. While on their way back to Bangalore, his friends arrive. Priya, whom Shivamanikandan has called often, tells Charulatha of his feelings for her. Charulatha reciprocates Shivamanikandan's love, as she too has fallen for him during the journey, thus both unite.

Cast
 Karthi as Shivamanikandan aka Shiva, a carefree man living in Bangalore. He falls in love with Charulatha and drives her to Mumbai, freeing her from the clutches of her uncle and his men.
 Tamannaah as Charulatha. She also lives in Bangalore after fleeing from a forced marriage arranged by her father.
 Sonia Deepti as Priya, Shiva's best friend. She cares a lot about Shiva and works to find him a job. Shiva shares his feelings only with Priya.
 Milind Soman as Baali, a gangster based in Mumbai. He plans to kill Shiva, who had humiliated him during his first trip to Mumbai, but the plan backfires, and his men are beaten up after repeated attempts to confront Shiva.
 Jagan as Poochi, a young simpleton and friend of Shiva, who lives in Mumbai. He becomes frightened after seeing Shiva beat up Baali's men and immediately drives him out of the city. He also changes his looks to avoid any more involvement in their gang.
 Darshan Jariwala as Charulatha's uncle. He is seen in a small role where he scolds Charulatha for coming to their home.
 Puneet Tejwani as Mahesh Vinayak, a Hindi-speaking man who takes a lift with Shiva and Charulatha after his car breaks down. He annoys Shiva when he sits in the back with Charulatha.
 Omar Lateef as Shiva's friend
 Arpit Ranka as Baali's henchman
 Jasper as Head Goon
 Rajkumar Kanojia as Rowdies gang member
 Daniel Annie Pope  as Rowdies gang member 
 Babu as Rowdies gang member

Production

Development
In September 2007, while working on Bheema, a film starring Vikram, Linguswamy announced that Karthi would star in his next venture to be launched in January 2008. He said that he had written a story "suitable for Karthi", further adding that it would be "an action oriented film". The following month, sources suggested that he was planning a bilingual project, filming simultaneously in Tamil and Telugu with Karthi and Ram Charan Teja, respectively. However, in early November, reports claimed that Vishal would portray the protagonist after Linguswamy had considered Jayam Ravi for the lead character. The reports proved to be false and Karthi was confirmed as the lead actor of the film.

The film failed to begin production in January 2008, with sources reporting in March that Linguswamy was still working on the script. The film was yet to be titled. It was to feature the main crew members of Bheema, including music director Harris Jayaraj, cinematographer R. D. Rajasekhar and editor Anthony. Linguswamy later announced the film with an entirely new crew; Yuvan Shankar Raja replaced Jayaraj as the film's music composer, and Madhi was selected as the cinematographer, after Rajasekhar had opted out of the project as he was busy working on Jaggubhai. Linguswamy chose Priya Manikandan, wife of cinematographer Manikandan, as the chief costume designer, for whom Paiyaa would be her first film project. Linguswamy further revealed that the film would be produced by his home production studio Thirupathi Brothers and denied that it was a remake of a Telugu film. Lingusamy disclosed later that he had written two scripts, out of which Karthi eventually chose Paiyaa, because he wanted to do an "urban love story" after two successive roles as a ruffian. Initially titled as Kuthirai, it was later renamed as Paiyaa, which was considered a tentative, working title only. Karthi said he was " ... dying to start shooting for Paiyaa " and to " ... wear good clothes ... and he accepted the film because he " ... desperately wanted to play a cool dude on screen.

The filming was supposed to begin in August 2008. However, due to the slow progress of Karthi's ongoing project, Aayirathil Oruvan, Paiyaa was postponed several times, since Karthi needed to maintain the continuity of his looks for his role in Aayirathil Oruvan. Its producer Ravindran complained at the Tamil Film Producers Council that Karthi was trying to change his look and move on to Paiyaa before finishing his commitments, which forced Linguswamy to readjust the schedules. The shooting finally began in December 2008. The film's music was released in November 2009 along with the trailer. In late 2009, after finishing the filming of Paiyaa, Lingusamy disclosed his plans of remaking the film in Telugu and Hindi as well. Later, as Yuganikki Okkadu, the Telugu dubbed version of Karthi's Aayirathil Oruvan, emerged as successful in Andhra Pradesh, the team instead decided to dub and release the film in Telugu to cash in on Karthi's new-found popularity in the state. The Telugu version was titled Awara and its audio was released in March 2010; Awara was released simultaneously with the Tamil version. In March 2010, the film's distribution rights were acquired by Dhayanidhi Alagiri's Cloud Nine Movies.

Casting
In July 2008, actress Nayantara was signed for the female lead role in Paiyaa for a record salary of 1 crore. Speaking about the issue, the director admitted that she was one of his favourite actress and he liked her performance in Yaaradi Nee Mohini. He also quoted: "The way her career graph shot up is intriguing. Unlike others her career progressed in reverse gear. She paired up with the superstar during the early years of her career and started accepting roles with heroes of next generation." She also expressed her interest to work in the project. However, plans were made to trim the film's budget due to the economic recession, and discussions were held with Nayantara to reduce her salary. The talks resulted in failure and Nayantara left the project in December 2008. Later, she was accused of cheating the director by refusing to return an advance of 15 lakh she had taken before commencement, after walking out of the film. The director filed a complaint with the Tamil Film Producers Council, which decided to ban the actress. Subsequently, Trisha was reported to have won the role, before Tamannaah was finalised as the female lead, who was signed for 80 lakh. Later in December 2008, Milind Soman, who had last appeared in Pachaikili Muthucharam, was signed up for the main antagonist's role, a Mumbai-based don, with other minor antagonists numbering up to 18.

Filming
After Karthi had completed his film Aayirathil Oruvan, the principal photography for Paiyaa began on 24 December 2008 at a highway near Bangalore. Shooting carried on in and around Bangalore in the following weeks. The film's main portions were extensively shot across some major highways, where the story plays, whilst the climax was filmed in Mumbai, where the journey would also end. The filming also took place in Tamil Nadu, Puducherry, Kerala and Andhra Pradesh.

In May 2009, a street fight was filmed near the Chembarambakkam Lake in Chennai. Later that month, a song ("Suthudhe Suthudhe Boomi"), choreographed by Sabeena Khan, was shot at Prasad Studios in Chennai, where a set had been erected by art director Rajeevan. The song was said to have featured computer graphics and visual effects with which forests and mountain ranges were created. In June 2009, after nearly six months of shooting, more than sixty-five percent of the project was completed, with a song and the climax sequences being the remaining parts to be filmed. A twenty-five-day schedule was to be held in Mumbai and Pune, but the shooting got halted in July due to heavy rains. In October 2009, the final action scenes of the climax involving Karthi and Milind Soman were filmed in Mumbai and its suburbs in a ten-day schedule, following which a rain song ("Adada Mazhaida"), featuring Karthi and Tamannaah, was shot at the Athirappilly waterfalls in Kerala.

Music

The soundtrack for Paiyaa was scored by Yuvan Shankar Raja, collaborating with Linguswamy again after Sandakozhi (2005). The audio launch function was held on 12 February 2010 at the Sathyam Cinemas, Chennai which was attended by many prominent film personalities; director Shankar released the soundtrack. The album originally features five songs with vocals by singers Karthik, Benny Dayal, Haricharan, Rahul Nambiar and composer Yuvan Shankar Raja himself. Three songs were reportedly composed and recorded in Singapore. The lyrics were provided by Na. Muthukumar. The album received highly positive reviews and responses from critics and audiences alike and the songs were considered to have played an important role for the film's success.

Release
Paiyaa was initially scheduled for a late 2009 release, but was pushed to 14 January 2010 coinciding with the Tamil harvest festival Thai Pongal. Karthi's second film Aayirathil Oruvan, which was in production for nearly three years, was also planned to release on the same day. According to the Tamil Film Producers Council, two films starring the same actor could not be released on the same day, so Aayirathil Oruvan was given priority, whilst Paiyaa was postponed for 30 days. The release was postponed again for some reasons, before finally hitting the screens on 2 April 2010. The film had its premiere at the Sathyam Cinemas, Chennai. A Telugu dubbed version of the film titled Awara was released on 21 May 2010 in Andhra Pradesh and also received positive response. The film was also dubbed into Hindi as Aakhri Baazi in 2013 for direct telecast on Zee Cinema.

Reception

Box office
Paiyaa got a solo release on 2 April 2010, coinciding with Good Friday. It earned 71 lakh in the opening weekend across Chennai with an average occupancy of 90%. The film grossed 3 crore in the first three days and was declared a commercial success within a few days. In the United Kingdom the film was distributed by B4U and was released across six screens, grossing £21,021 in the opening weekend, opening at the 23rd place. Furthermore, in Malaysia, the film opened across 34 screens and collected $349,368 after the second week. In Tamil Nadu, it netted 13 crore from 300 screens in two weeks.

Critical reception
Upon release, the film generally received positive reviews, with most critics calling the film "summer entertainer" and lauding its technical aspects. Sify described the film as a "road movie laced with mass elements and extraordinary songs", adding that it is a "jolly good ride". The reviewer praised the "loveable lead pair" for their "credible performance, which makes up for the plot holes". He said that technically the film was Linguswamy's his best, with Mathi's "eye-catching camera work", Antony's "crisp editing", Rajeevan's "exotic set designs", and praised composer Yuvan Shankar Raja, whose "foot-tapping" songs "scorch just like the desert sun" and were all "rocking", while his background score was a "perfect co-ordination with the narration". A reviewer from the Times of India, Bhama Devi Ravi, gave the film 3 out of 5 stars, writing that "the story is not earth-shatteringly new, but what pulls you into the movie is the different spin that Lingusamy gives to the familiar story". She praised the lead pair's performance, particularly Karthi, who "comes up with an enjoyable performance", as well as the film's technical values, describing the camera work as "mind-blowing", Brinda Sarathy's dialogues as "thoroughly enjoyable" and Yuvan Shankar Raja's songs as "a real treat". Indiaglitz described the film as a "racy action-adventure" and "undeniably an entertainer this summer", writing that Linguswamy has brought out "a classy entertainer" and Karthi and Tamannaah's performances are "absolutely great". Regarding the technical crew, the reviewer cited that the camera work was "immaculate", while editor Anthony and stunt coordinator Kanal Kannan had done "an incredible and marvellous job". The music, in particular, was described as "the greatest strength of the movie" and his background score as "excellent".

Behindwoods gave the film 2.5 out of 5 stars, describing the film as "a stylish, light-hearted family entertainer for the summer" and a "Pacy road show with a few humps on a straight run". It too, like the other reviewers, cited that Karthi had brought out an "enjoyable performance", whilst describing Yuvan Shankar Raja as "the major backbone of Paiya". Moreover, he cited that Brinda Sarathy's dialogues "evoke laughter", the car chasing sequence is "absolutely brilliant", the cinematographer "needs plaudits" and the "crisp editing" by Anthony as a "major plus point." In contrast, Rediff's Pavithra Srinivasan cited that there was "[n]othing entertaining about Paiyya" and that film was worth a watch only for Karthi's screen presence, "pretty" Tamannaah and Yuvan's songs, despite giving 2.5 out of 5 stars. She criticised Linguswamy's script as the film's "biggest minus", adding that the film "starts out so very promisingly", describing the first half was "racy, peppy and enthusiastic, only to fizzle out with no appreciable sequences in the second half."

Accolades

Remakes 
Paiyaa was remade in Bengali in 2012 as Jaaneman, starring Soham Chakraborty and Koel Mallick, and in Kannada in 2014 as Ajith, with Chiranjeevi Sarja playing the male lead.

References

External links
 
 
 
 

2010 films
Films shot in Kerala
Films shot in Chalakudy
Films shot in Thrissur
2010s action adventure films
2010s chase films
2010s road movies
2010s romantic action films
Indian action adventure films
Indian chase films
Indian road movies
Indian romantic action films
Films set in Bangalore
Films shot in Puducherry
Films shot in Andhra Pradesh
Tamil films remade in other languages
Films shot in Mumbai
Films scored by Yuvan Shankar Raja
2010s Tamil-language films
2010s masala films
Films directed by N. Lingusamy
Films shot in Bangalore
Films set in Mumbai